Rupert Mark Lovell Gethin (born 1957, in Edinburgh) is Professor of Buddhist Studies in the Department of Theology and Religious Studies and codirector of the Centre for Buddhist Studies at the University of Bristol, and (since 2003) president of the Pali Text Society.  He holds a BA in Comparative Religion (1980), a master's degree in Buddhist Studies (1982), and a PhD in Buddhist Studies (1987), all from the University of Manchester.  He was appointed Lecturer in Indian Religions by the University of Bristol in 1987, and then Professor In Buddhist Studies in 2009.

His main area of research is the history and development of Buddhist thought and practice in the Nikayas and Abhidhamma. His major publications include The Buddhist Path to Awakening and Sayings of the Buddha: New translations from the Pali Nikayas. His 1998 book The Foundations of Buddhism is frequently used in university-level classes on Buddhism in English-speaking countries.

Gethin is a practicing Buddhist. He initially studied meditation in the Samatha Trust organization, which has its roots in the meditation practice of Nai Boonman, a former Thai Theravadan Buddhist monk. Gethin has led a class on mindfulness of breathing in Bristol since the 1990s.

References

Sources

External links
 Gethin's staff page at the University of Bristol, with publication history and biography
 University Chaplaincy - Buddhist Chaplains

1957 births
Academics of the University of Bristol
Alumni of the University of Manchester
British scholars of Buddhism
Living people
Linguists of Pali
Scottish Buddhists